The 1996 NASCAR Busch Series began February 17 and ended November 3. Randy LaJoie of BACE Motorsports was crowned the series champion.

Teams and drivers
List of full-time teams at the start of 1996.

Races

Goody's Headache Powder 300 

The Goody's Headache Powder 300 was held February 17 at Daytona International Speedway. Jeff Purvis won the pole.

Top ten results

29-Steve Grissom
32-Dale Jarrett
60-Mark Martin
92-Larry Pearson
63-Curtis Markham
43-Rodney Combs
74-Randy LaJoie
26-Derrike Cope
44-Bobby Labonte
20-Jimmy Spencer
This was the first NASCAR start for Tony Stewart.

Goodwrench Service 200 

The Goodwrench Service 200 was held February 24 at North Carolina Speedway. Mark Martin won the pole.

Top ten results

60-Mark Martin
34-Mike McLaughlin
4-Jeff Purvis
2-Ricky Craven
44-Bobby Labonte
95-David Green
74-Randy LaJoie
57-Jason Keller
5-Terry Labonte
81-Todd Bodine

Hardee's Fried Chicken Challenge 250 

The Hardee's Fried Chicken Challenge 250 was Held March 2 at Richmond International Raceway. Jeff Purvis won the pole.

Top ten results

4-Jeff Purvis
87-Joe Nemechek
95-David Green
90-Mike Wallace
63-Curtis Markham
74-Randy LaJoie
57-Jason Keller
81-Todd Bodine
32-Dale Jarrett
5-Terry Labonte

Busch Light 300 

The Busch Light 300 was held March 9 at Atlanta Motor Speedway. Dick Trickle won the pole.

Top ten results

5-Terry Labonte
95-David Green
10-Phil Parsons
29-Steve Grissom
49-Stanton Barrett
43-Rodney Combs
60-Mark Martin
22-Ward Burton
44-Bobby Labonte
87-Joe Nemechek

BellSouth/Opryland USA 320 

The BellSouth/Opryland USA 320 was held March 17 at Nashville Speedway USA. Sterling Marlin won the pole.

Top ten results

44-Bobby Labonte
95-David Green
10-Phil Parsons
5-Terry Labonte
63-Curtis Markham
87-Joe Nemechek
99-Glenn Allen Jr.
64-Dick Trickle
98-Jeremy Mayfield
55-Bobby Dotter

Dura Lube 200 (March 23) 

The Dura Lube 200 was held March 23 at Darlington Raceway. Jeff Green won the pole.

Top ten results

60-Mark Martin
12-Michael Waltrip
5-Terry Labonte
2-Ricky Craven
44-Bobby Labonte
32-Dale Jarrett
29-Steve Grissom
81-Todd Bodine
64-Dick Trickle
22-Ward Burton

Goody's Headache Powder 250 

The Goody's Headache Powder 250 was held March 30 at Bristol Motor Speedway. Chad Little won the pole.

Top ten results

60-Mark Martin
3-Jeff Green
8-Kenny Wallace
10-Phil Parsons
29-Steve Grissom
74-Randy LaJoie
95-David Green
64-Dick Trickle
90-Mike Wallace
47-Jeff Fuller

Sundrop 300 

The Sundrop 300 was held April 6 at Hickory Motor Speedway. David Green won the pole.

Top ten results

95-David Green
1-Hermie Sadler
74-Randy LaJoie
57-Jason Keller
81-Todd Bodine
51-Jimmy Spencer
3-Jeff Green
88-Kevin Lepage
63-Curtis Markham
92-Larry Pearson

CoreStates/Meridian Advantage 200 

The CoreStates/Meridian Advantage 200 was held May 19 at Nazareth Speedway. David Green won the pole.

Top ten results

74-Randy LaJoie*
95-David Green
3-Jeff Green
64-Dick Trickle
57-Jason Keller
6-Tommy Houston
88-Kevin Lepage
40-Tim Fedewa
81-Todd Bodine
99-Glenn Allen Jr.

Shane Hall flipped in this race.

This was the first win for Randy LaJoie.
Toshio Suzuki became the first Japanese driver to qualify for a NASCAR race.

Red Dog 300 

The Red Dog 300 was held May 25 at Charlotte Motor Speedway. Dale Jarrett won the pole. Future Cup Series champion Matt Kenseth made his debut.

Top ten results

60-Mark Martin
64-Dick Trickle
44-Bobby Labonte
5-Terry Labonte
74-Randy LaJoie
32-Dale Jarrett
26-Derrike Cope
87-Joe Nemechek
90-Mike Wallace
22-Ward Burton

GM Goodwrench/Delco 200 

The GM Goodwrench/Delco 200 was held June 1 at Dover International Speedway. Bobby Labonte won the pole.

Top ten results

74-Randy LaJoie
2-Ricky Craven
5-Terry Labonte
95-David Green
90-Mike Wallace
32-Dale Jarrett
3-Jeff Green
10-Phil Parsons
92-Larry Pearson
1-Hermie Sadler

Winston Motorsports 300 

The Winston Motorsports 300 was held June 8 at South Boston Speedway. Randy LaJoie won the pole. Mike Harmon would make his NASCAR debut in this race

Top ten results

81-Todd Bodine
34-Mike McLaughlin
3-Jeff Green
92-Larry Pearson
74-Randy LaJoie
63-Curtis Markham
1-Hermie Sadler
23-Chad Little
88-Kevin Lepage
72-Mike Dillon

Carolina Pride/Advance Auto Parts 250 

The Carolina Pride/Advance Auto Parts 250 was held June 22 at Myrtle Beach Speedway. David Green won the pole. This race marked the NASCAR debut of Dale Earnhardt Jr., driving the #31 Chevrolet. Earnhardt started 7th and finished 14th.

Top ten results

95-David Green
4-Jeff Purvis
57-Jason Keller
88-Kevin Lepage
3-Jeff Green
34-Mike McLaughlin
64-Dick Trickle
43-Dennis Setzer
63-Curtis Markham
37-Mark Green

Lysol 200 

The Lysol 200 was held June 30 at Watkins Glen International. David Green won the pole.

Top ten results

5-Terry Labonte
81-Todd Bodine
34-Mike McLaughlin
44-Bobby Labonte
95-David Green
3-Jeff Green
20-Jimmy Spencer
23-Chad Little
8-Kenny Wallace
57-Jason Keller

Sears Auto Center 250 

The Sears Auto Center 250 was held July 7 at The Milwaukee Mile. Hermie Sadler won the pole.

Top ten results

00-Buckshot Jones
34-Mike McLaughlin
74-Randy LaJoie
8-Kenny Wallace
44-Bobby Labonte
75-Doug Heveron
3-Jeff Green
6-Tommy Houston
47-Jeff Fuller
57-Jason Keller

This was Buckshot Jones's first Busch Series win.

Stanley 200 

The Stanley 200 was held July 12 at New Hampshire International Speedway. The race was originally scheduled to run on May 12, but was rescheduled for July 12 (Friday morning) because of rain. The field was set according to where they qualified on May 11. David Green won the pole.

Top ten results

74-Randy LaJoie
5-Terry Labonte
95-David Green
3-Jeff Green
44-Bobby Labonte
1-Hermie Sadler
81-Todd Bodine
57-Jason Keller
34-Mike McLaughlin
90-Mike Wallace

Humminbird Fishfinder 500K 

The Humminbird Fishfinder 500K was held July 27 at Talladega Superspeedway. Joe Nemechek won the pole.

Top ten results

29-Greg Sacks
87-Joe Nemechek
74-Randy LaJoie
5-Terry Labonte
12-Michael Waltrip
4-Jeff Purvis
64-Dick Trickle
47-Jeff Fuller
88-Kevin Lepage
95-David Green

Kroger 200 

The Kroger 200 was held August 2 at Indianapolis Raceway Park. Randy LaJoie won the pole.

Top ten results

74-Randy LaJoie
34-Mike McLaughlin
95-David Green
40-Tim Fedewa
32-Dale Jarrett
43-Dennis Setzer
4-Jeff Purvis
64-Dick Trickle
00-Buckshot Jones
11-Tracy Leslie

Detroit Gasket 200 

The Detroit Gasket 200 was held August 16 at Michigan International Speedway. Ricky Craven won the pole.

Top ten results

4-Jeff Purvis
88-Kevin Lepage
5-Terry Labonte
60-Mark Martin
2-Ricky Craven
44-Bobby Labonte
95-David Green
28-Hut Stricklin
29-Elliott Sadler
74-Randy LaJoie

Food City 250 

The Food City 250 was held August 23 at Bristol Motor Speedway. Jeff Fuller won the pole.

Top ten results

47-Jeff Fuller
32-Dale Jarrett
10-Phil Parsons
20-Jimmy Spencer
12-Michael Waltrip
26-Derrike Cope
63-Curtis Markham
3-Jeff Green
57-Jason Keller
5-Terry Labonte

This was Jeff Fuller's first (and only) Busch Series win.

Dura Lube 200 (August 31) 

The Dura Lube 200 was held August 31 at Darlington Raceway. Mark Martin won the pole.

Top ten results

5-Terry Labonte
60-Mark Martin
64-Dick Trickle
95-David Green
74-Randy LaJoie
2-Ricky Craven
3-Jeff Green
32-Dale Jarrett
88-Kevin Lepage
6-Tommy Houston

Autolite Platinum 250 

The Autolite Platinum 250 was held September 8 at Richmond International Raceway. Michael Waltrip won the pole.

Top ten results

8-Kenny Wallace
95-David Green
23-Chad Little
60-Mark Martin
64-Dick Trickle
4-Jeff Purvis
98-Jeremy Mayfield
74-Randy LaJoie
44-Bobby Labonte
5-Terry Labonte

MBNA 200 

The MBNA 200 was held September 14 at Dover International Speedway. Ricky Craven won the pole.

Top ten results

74-Randy LaJoie
32-Dale Jarrett
10-Phil Parsons
5-Terry Labonte
2-Ricky Craven
34-Mike McLaughlin
29-Elliott Sadler
38-Elton Sawyer
23-Chad Little
1-Hermie Sadler

All Pro Bumper to Bumper 300 

The All Pro Bumper to Bumper 300 was held October 5 at Charlotte Motor Speedway. Bobby Labonte won the pole.

Top ten results

60-Mark Martin
44-Bobby Labonte
92-Sterling Marlin
23-Chad Little
34-Mike McLaughlin
74-Randy LaJoie
88-Kevin Lepage
3-Jeff Green
20-Jimmy Spencer
57-Jason Keller

 Steve Park made his series debut in his race, driving the No. 31 Chevrolet for Dale Earnhardt Inc. Park qualified 13th, but crashed out of the race on lap 117 and posted a 29th place finish.

AC-Delco 200 

The AC-Delco 200 was held October 19 at North Carolina Speedway. Buckshot Jones won the pole.

Top ten results

60-Mark Martin
32-Dale Jarrett
2-Ricky Craven
34-Mike McLaughlin
95-David Green
5-Terry Labonte
88-Kevin Lepage
3-Jeff Green
74-Randy LaJoie
23-Chad Little

Jiffy Lube Miami 300 

The Jiffy Lube Miami 300 was held November 3 at Homestead-Miami Speedway. Bobby Labonte won the pole.

Top ten results

88-Kevin Lepage
44-Bobby Labonte
60-Mark Martin
87-Joe Nemechek
29-Elliott Sadler
20-Jimmy Spencer
23-Chad Little
81-Todd Bodine
95-David Green
74-Randy LaJoie
This was Kevin Lepage's first career victory.

Final points standings 

Randy LaJoie - 3714
David Green - 3685
Todd Bodine - 3064 
Jeff Green - 3059
Chad Little - 2984
Jason Keller - 2900
Jeff Purvis - 2894
Kevin Lepage - 2870
Phil Parsons - 2854
Mike McLaughlin - 2853
Curtis Markham - 2838
Dick Trickle - 2728
Terry Labonte - 2699
Glenn Allen Jr. - 2593
Hermie Sadler - 2588 
Larry Pearson -  2471
Jeff Fuller - 2399
Rodney Combs - 2396
Bobby Labonte - 2374
Tim Fedewa - 2320
Mark Martin - 2186
Dale Jarrett - 2109
Mike Dillon - 1945
Bobby Dotter - 1832
Buckshot Jones - 1708
Mike Wallace - 1664
Dennis Setzer - 1567
Tommy Houston - 1563
Ricky Craven - 1503
Doug Heveron - 1488
Patty Moise - 1458
Jimmy Spencer - 1392
Jim Bown - 1346
Michael Waltrip - 1342
Elliott Sadler - 1301
Stevie Reeves - 1290
Randy Porter - 1283
Joe Nemechek - 1282
Elton Sawyer - 1217
Derrike Cope - 1200
Kenny Wallace - 1189
Shane Hall - 1175
Jeremy Mayfield - 1051
Joe Bessey - 1023
Steve Grissom - 1005
Mark Green - 947
Ward Burton -  919
Hut Stricklin -  791  
Tony Stewart - 753
Tracy Leslie - 645

Full Drivers' Championship

(key) Bold – Pole position awarded by time. Italics – Pole position set by owner's points. * – Most laps led.

Rookie of the Year 
Former short track racer Glenn Allen Jr. was named Rookie of the Year in 1996, posting two top-ten finishes early in the season, as well as being of only two full-time contenders for the award. Mike Dillon was the other, finishing 23rd in points. Shane Hall, Mark Green and Tony Stewart were the other contenders, all running part-time schedules.

See also 
 1996 NASCAR Winston Cup Series
 1996 NASCAR Craftsman Truck Series

External links 
Busch Series standings and statistics for 1996

NASCAR Xfinity Series seasons